A bronze statue of Charles Carroll of Carrollton by Richard E. Brooks is installed in the crypt of the United States Capitol, in Washington, D.C., as part of the National Statuary Hall Collection. It was gifted by the U.S. state of Maryland in 1903.

See also
 1903 in art

References

External links

 

1903 establishments in Washington, D.C.
1903 sculptures
Bronze sculptures in Washington, D.C.
Monuments and memorials in Washington, D.C.
National Statuary Hall Collection
Sculptures of men in Washington, D.C.
Statues of U.S. Founding Fathers